The Georgetown Institute of Politics and Public Service is an academic center at Georgetown University in Washington, D.C., dedicated to the study of regional and national politics. It is housed within the McCourt School of Public Policy and was created in the fall of 2013 alongside the school's founding. In 2015, Mo Elleithee, the former communications director of the Democratic National Committee, was appointed its first Executive Director. In the fall of 2015, the Institute launched its first programs. The goal of the institute is to serve as an "incubator of political thought" in a bipartisan manner and to study such matters as leadership, governance, elections, and public engagement. It brings candidates for public office and incumbents, including presidential candidates, and political practitioners to Georgetown's campus and enable "student-driven conversation."

History 

The Institute of Politics and Public Service, known as GU Politics, was founded as part of the new McCourt School of Public Policy at Georgetown University in 2013 and launched in the fall of 2015. The Institute of Politics and Public Service is dedicated to reconnecting young people with the notion that politics is a noble vehicle for public service including Nancy Pelosi, Mark Zuckerberg, and President Bill Clinton, among numerous others. 

In November 2015, the Institute brought democratic hopeful Bernie Sanders to campus for a speech on what democratic socialism means in the United States. In April 2021, then-GOP House Conference Chair Liz Cheney appeared at the GU Politics Forum to speak about the future of the Republican Party in the aftermath of the 2021 storming of the United States Capitol.

In 2020, the Institute hosted a two-day Climate Forum event in which twelve presidential candidates spoke on the urgency of the climate crisis and how to best address it.

Experiential programs 

Each year, GU Politics organizes trips to visit party conventions, caucuses, national and international elections, and more in order to allow students to experience politics firsthand.  

Hoyas in Iowa - the 2020 Iowa Caucus
Students spent four days on the ground leading up to the Iowa caucus. While in Des Moines, these students had the chance to hear directly from candidates and their surrogates from both sides of the aisle, talk to senior campaign staff who shared insight into their strategies in the lead up to the nation’s first primary contest, and chat with national and state journalists to understand how each covers caucus night.

Hoyas in Mexico -  the 2018 Mexico Election
Sponsored by GU Politics and supported by the Walsh School of Foreign Service (SFS), this program offered Georgetown students a chance to witness firsthand the political strategy, perspectives, and popular energy of Mexico’s 2018 general election. These students spent a week in Mexico attending meetings with candidates, campaign staffers and strategists, party leaders, and journalists, and witnessing events in the run-up to the July 1st vote.

Students attended a PAN rally – National Action Party, the leading conservative party in the nation’s political spectrum. Watching voting occur on election day, students noticed some of the substantial cultural and legal differences in how voting works in Mexico. Citizens were guaranteed free voting IDs, while some particularly popular polling sites ran out of ballots. Ultimately, they saw the historic win of President Andrés Manuel López Obrador.

Ahead of the election, they sat down with Agustín Barrios Gómez, a PRD – Party of the Democratic Revolution – Deputy representing the Federal District of Mexico City. That discussion focused on the unique dynamics of this election, background on Mexican politics, and answers to many of the students’ questions.

Hoyas in GA - Georgia 2017 special election

HoyasinGA was a trip for Georgetown students to witness in-person the 2017 special election in Georgia’s 6th Congressional District – called after the former Congressman Tom Price was made HHS Secretary. Along the way, they sat down in discussions with some of the candidates and campaign staffers behind this exciting race for Congress. The students had an opportunity to learn directly from the people shaping the future of the district and the state of Georgia, hearing their hopes, strategies, and expectations in the last few days before the election.

Hoyas in UK - the 2017 parliamentary election
Sponsored by GU Politics and the Walsh School of Foreign Service (SFS), Georgetown offered students a chance to witness first hand the political strategy, tactics, and energy of the UK’s 2017 snap general election. Students spent a week in London attending meetings with candidates, campaign staffers and strategists, party leaders, and journalists. From multiple perspectives and ideologies across the spectrum, they witnessed events in the run-up to and during the June 8 vote.

Hoyas at RNC - Republican National Convention 2016
A group of ten Georgetown students had the unique opportunity to get behind the scenes at the Republican National Convention in Cleveland, Ohio. These Convention Ambassadors, along with GU Politics Executive Director Mo Elleithee, spent six days at the convention meeting with party officials, strategists, journalists and politicians. Over the trip to Cleveland, these ten students had incredible and unique opportunities to hear from major figures in the Republican Party. They watched Donald Trump accept the nomination, heard professional analysis on the future of America and the GOP both, and came back sharing some of their reflections that week.

Hoyas at DNC - Democratic National Convention 2016
A group of Georgetown students had the unique opportunity to get behind the scenes at the Democratic National Convention in Philadelphia, Pennsylvania. These Convention Ambassadors, along with GU Politics Executive Director Mo Elleithee, spent six days at the convention meeting with party officials, strategists, journalists, and politicians to get an all-encompassing view of the convention process, and the dynamics at play behind it.

References

External links 
 Official site

Georgetown University programs
Academic organizations based in the United States